Cervaphis is a genus of aphids of the family Aphididae.

References

Greenideinae
Sternorrhyncha genera